Ürümqi Bus Rapid Transit (BRT) is a bus rapid transit system in Ürümqi, Xinjiang, China. It began trial operations in August, 2011 and official operation in September.

Lines
 BRT1:  in length, 21 stations,
 BRT2:  in length, 17 stations,
 BRT3:  in length, 17 stations,
 BRT5:  in length, 11 stations.

References

External links 
 乌鲁木齐BRT快速公交 (Chinese)

Bus Rapid Transit
Bus rapid transit in China